Through the Fire is the first and only studio album by the band Hagar Schon Aaronson Shrieve, also known as HSAS. The album was recorded live with guitar overdubs added later. The only single, a cover of Procol Harum's "Whiter Shade of Pale", reached No. 94 on the Billboard Hot 100 chart.

Track listing

Personnel
Sammy Hagar – lead vocals, producer
Neal Schon – lead and rhythm guitars, producer
Kenny Aaronson – bass
Michael Shrieve – drums

Production
Don Smith – engineer, mixing
Greg Ladanyi – mixing
Doug Sax, Mike Reese – mastering

Singles
"Whiter Shade of Pale" b/w "Hot And Dirty" – US (Geffen 29280-7)
"Whiter Shade of Pale" b/w "Hot And Dirty" – Japan (Geffen 07SP 804)
"Whiter Shade of Pale" b/w "Whiter Shade of Pale (edit)" – US Promo (Geffen 7-29280)
"Whiter Shade of Pale" b/w etched signatures in wax – US Promo (Geffen PRO-A-2142)

Releases 
 Geffen (US) : GHS 4023
 Geffen (Japan) : 23AP 2825
 Geffen (Netherlands) : GEF 25893
 Geffen (US) : CD 050059.2

References

Hagar Schon Aaronson Shrieve albums
1984 debut albums
Geffen Records albums